{{DISPLAYTITLE:C8H12}}
The molecular formula C8H12 may refer to:

 Cyclooctadienes
 1,3-Cyclooctadiene
 1,5-Cyclooctadiene
 Cyclooctyne
 [2.2.2]Propellane
 [4.1.1]Propellane
 4-Vinylcyclohexene

Molecular formulas